Ústí is a Czech toponym meaning river-mouth. It may refer to places in the Czech Republic:

Ústí (Jihlava District), a municipality and village in the Vysočina Region
Ústí (Přerov District), a municipality and village in the Olomouc Region
Ústí (Vsetín District), a municipality and village in the Zlín Region
Ústí nad Labem, a city
Ústí nad Labem District, a district surrounding the city
Ústí nad Labem Region, a region in the north-western part of the country
Ústí nad Orlicí, a town in the Pardubice Region
Ústí nad Orlicí District, a district surrounding the town
Sezimovo Ústí, a town in the South Bohemian Region